Broch of Mousa (or Mousa Broch) is a preserved Iron Age broch or round tower. It is on the island of Mousa in Shetland, Scotland. It is the tallest broch still standing and amongst the best-preserved prehistoric buildings in Europe. It is thought to have been constructed c. 100 BC, and is one of more than 500 brochs built in Scotland. The site is managed by Historic Environment Scotland as a scheduled monument.

Location
The broch is located on the western shore of the island of Mousa. It stands on the flat rock surface of a low promontory near the shore overlooking Mousa Sound.

It is the tallest broch still standing and amongst the best-preserved prehistoric buildings in Europe.

Description

Mousa Broch has one of the smallest overall diameters of any broch, as well as one of the thickest wall bases and smallest interiors; this massive construction (as well as its remote location) is likely to be the main explanation for its excellent state of preservation. Once inside, a visitor may ascend an internal staircase to the top. It is the only broch which is complete nearly to the top, including the original intramural stair. It is built of dry stone with no mortar. The entrance is on the west side but has been altered at various times from its original appearance.

Inside a hearth and floor tank can be seen in the central space. There is a low stone bench around the base of the inside wall, which was part of an early alteration to the interior. The broch went through at least two phases of occupation. In its original condition it may or may not have contained a wooden roundhouse resting on the scarcement ledges and presumably on a ring of posts set into the primary floor. (It has recently been argued that the scarcements may have supported scaffolding in a roofless building. At a later date, if the wooden building existed, it was demolished to make way for a small wheelhouse (with three projecting stone piers) in the interior. Scarcement ledges at heights of  might have supported the putative timber building. The other main feature of the ground floor is the three large cells within the walls. Above the lintel of each cell door are further openings which seem designed to let light and air into the chamber behind. The cells all have recesses, or large cupboards, set into the thickness of the wall.

Above the solid base of the broch are six galleries. They are formed by the space between the two concentric walls of the upper part of the broch, and are partly lit by voids. It is possible to walk along most of the galleries. They were probably used by the builders as an aid to constructing the building, rather than for accommodation or storage.

The stair, which begins at the second level, is reached by a doorway in the inner wall face, which has an adjacent cell. There is also an upper cell above the entrance passage.

Later history

Mousa Broch continued to be used over the centuries and is mentioned in two Norse Sagas. Egil's Saga tells of a couple eloping from Norway to Iceland who were shipwrecked and used the broch as a temporary refuge. The Orkneyinga Saga gives an account of a siege of the broch by Earl Harald Maddadsson in 1153 following the abduction of his mother, who was held inside the broch.

The site was visited by the antiquarian George Low during his tour of 1774, and he provided the first drawings of the broch. It was visited by Sir Walter Scott in 1814, who described it as "a Pictish fortress, the most entire probably in the world." The geologist and antiquarian Samuel Hibbert visited it in 1818 and provided a detailed account of the site. The first accurate survey was conducted by Sir Henry Dryden in 1852 and 1866.

Excavations
Mousa was cleared of debris and repaired in 1861 and great quantities of animal bones, especially of otters (which probably inhabited the deserted ruin) were found. The interior was cleared again by the Office of Works in 1919, and few additional finds emerged. In the National Museum of Scotland in Edinburgh are some pottery sherds, including a large black-burnished rim sherd, probably found during the 19th century clearance. There was major rebuilding of the broch from 1967 until the 1980s.

In January 2005 it was announced that archaeologists had used 3D laser scanning to investigate the structure in detail for further possible repairs.

Storm petrels
Mousa Broch is well known among birders for its breeding European storm petrels, which are best seen after dark on partly or on completely overcast summer nights. The island holds around 6,800 breeding pairs in total, representing about 8% of the British population and about 2.6% of the world population. Some of these birds nest in burrows within the broch itself.

See also
Oldest buildings in Scotland

References

Further reading
 Armit, I. (2003)  Towers in the North: The Brochs of Scotland. Stroud. Tempus. 
  E W MacKie 2002 The roundhouses, brochs and wheelhouses of Atlantic Scotland c. 700 BC -  500:  architecture and material culture. Part 1: the Orkney and Shetland Isles.  BAR British series 342:  Oxford.   Section 2 and site HU46 6, pp. 82–87 & illustrations.
 RCAHMS 1946, vol. 3, no. 1206, pp. 48–55 & illustrations.  (Royal Commission on the Ancient and Historical Monuments of Scotland) Edinburgh.

External links

 D. Thomas 2011 'An Investigation of Aural Space inside Mousa Broch by Observation and Analysis of Sound and Light', Internet Archaeology 30.
Mousa Broch at Historic Scotland.
Mousa Broch, Shetland structure at Sketchfab by Historic Environment Scotland

Mousa
Historic Scotland properties in Shetland
Scheduled Ancient Monuments in Shetland
Buildings and structures completed in the 1st century BC